Moody High School is a four-year public high school in the Birmingham, Alabama suburb of Moody. It is one of five high schools in the St. Clair County School System. School colors are navy blue and Vegas gold, and the athletic teams are called the Blue Devils. Moody competes in AHSAA Class 5A athletics.

The current Moody High School campus was constructed in 2002 at a cost of $8.2 million.

Student profile 
Enrollment in grades 9-12 for the 2013-14 school year is 667 students. Approximately 84% of students are white, 11% are African-American, 2% are Hispanic, 1% are Asian-American, and 2% are multiracial. Roughly 40% of students qualify for free or reduced price lunch.

Moody has a graduation rate of 77%. Approximately 87% of its students meet or exceed state proficiency standards in mathematics, and 82% meet or exceed standards in reading.

Athletics 
Moody competes in AHSAA Class 5A athletics and fields teams in the following sports:
 Baseball
 Basketball
 Cheerleading
 Cross Country
 Football
 Golf
 Indoor Track & Field
 Outdoor Track & Field
 Soccer
 Softball
 Tennis
 Volleyball
 Wrestling
Moody's football team won regional championships in 1987, 1994, and 2004. It has appeared in the state football playoffs 13 times.

References

External links 
 Moody High School website
 Moody High School football history

Public high schools in Alabama
High schools in Birmingham, Alabama
Educational institutions established in 2002
2002 establishments in Alabama